The siege of Verona in the winter of 541, was an engagement during the Gothic War (535–554).

The Byzantine army almost took the city after taking over the city gate with the assistance of an insider, but a quarrel erupted among the Byzantines regarding the distribution of the booty. The Ostrogoths under Totila exploited the disarray and retook the city.

Siege

The Romans besieged the city with some 12,000 troops. During the siege, a local guard of the Ostrogoth army collaborated with the Romans, and let them enter the city. Being forced to retreat out of the city, the Ostrogoths took advantage of the disorganized Roman army, most of whom were still located outside the city and were preoccupied with arguing over the "distribution" of the loot; with the gate still open, the Ostrogoths rushed inside and attacked the Romans from inside the city. Those Romans who already happened to be inside the city, where thus forced to "jump" out of it, in order to get away.

After the Byzantines lifted the siege, Totila pursued, and defeated them at the Battle of Faventia.

Footnotes

References

Sources
 
 

Verona
540s in the Byzantine Empire
541
Verona
Verona
Verona
Gothic War (535–554)
History of Verona